Recipharm AB is one of the five largest pharmaceutical contract development and manufacturing organizations in the world, with production facilities in Sweden, France, Germany, Italy, Spain, Portugal, India and the UK as well as development sites in Sweden, Israel and the United States. The Swedish-based company employs around 9,000 people and operates over 30 facilities. The company provides pharmaceutical companies around the world with end-to-end development and manufacturing services, including a wide variety of dosage forms. Recipharm was listed on the Stockholm Stock Exchange in April 2014.

History

Recip 1995-2007
In March 1995, Thomas Eldered and Lars Backsell conducted a management buyout of a Pharmacia solid dose tablet manufacturing facility in Årsta, Stockholm and formed the company “Recip”. The facility had 130 employees and a turnover of SEK 220 million. The company continued to manufacture pharmaceutical products for Pharmacia during a transition period while it also developed its own products. Recip also began providing contract manufacturing services to other pharmaceutical companies.

In 1997, Recip was believed to be the first pharmaceutical company in the world to certify its entire operations according to the ISO 14001 environmental management system. From 1998, the company began to grow by acquiring facilities in Sweden. The brand name “Recipharm” was established in 2001 for the growing contract manufacturing part of Recip's business. In 2007, the Recip part of the business and the company's own portfolio were divested to Meda.

Recipharm 2007-present 
Following the sale of Recip, the company focused on its contract manufacturing business. The capital from the sale of Recip was used to make further acquisitions – initially in Europe and later the US and India. Acquisitions were used to broaden the company's offering and customer base, and to enter new markets.

Recipharm became a public listed company on Nasdaq Stockholm in 2014.  Between 2014 and 2019, Recipharm's sales grew by an average of more than 30 per cent annually, including a combination of internal growth and acquisitions. In 2020, Recipharm completed its largest acquisition to date. The £505 million takeover of UK-based Consort Medical added around 2,000 employees and ten European facilities to the company, as well as new device capabilities.

In February 2021, Private equity firm EQT acquired Recipharm for $2.1 billion. In March 2021, Mark Funk joined Recipharm as CEO, replacing Thomas Eldered who remains on the board of directors.

The Recipharm International Environmental Award 
Recipharm's International Environmental Award is annually awarded for the best environmental performance or environmental innovation within the pharmaceutical industry or academia.

External Recognition 
2006 - Environmental Leadership award from the NMC Swedish Association for Sustainable business
2012 - Ernst & Young ‘Entrepreneur of the Year prize’ for Best International growth was awarded to Thomas Eldered and Lars Backsell
2014 - The Royal Patriotic Society awarded Thomas Eldered and Lars Backsell with the Enterprise medal for outstanding entrepreneurship
2015 - The annual SwedenBIO Award was presented to Recipharm for their contribution to Sweden life science during the year

References

External links
Recipharm.com
List of all Award winners since 2008

Pharmaceutical companies of Sweden
Manufacturing companies based in Stockholm